Air Commodore Abdus Sattar Alvi (Urdu:   عبد الستار علوی), is a retired one-star rank air officer and a fighter pilot in the Pakistan Air Force, who is renowned for his gallant actions during the third Indo-Pakistani in 1971, and served as a military advisor in the Syrian Air Force during the Yom Kippur War of 1973.

In 1974, Alvi shot down the Israeli Air Force's Mirage III over the dogfight took place in Golan Heights in Syria, and was honored for his bravery with gallantry war-time medals by Syrian and Pakistan government.

Biography

Sattar Alvi was born in Jalandhar, Punjab, British India in 1944, into a Punjabi family that had the military background. His father was an officer in the British Indian Army who later served in the Pakistan Army. He was educated at the Bannu where he did his matriculation and attended the Emerson College in Multan, Punjab where he secured his graduation.

In 1963, he was accepted to join the Air Force Academy in Risalpur where he received his flight training on the Cessna T-37T, and graduated in General Duty Pilot (GD) course in 1965. P/Off. Alvi participated in the second war with India in 1965, touring his duty as  "Mail Runners" to convey messages from one base to another, served on this assignment until the war was ended.

From 1966 to 1971, Flt.Lt (Capt.) Alvi was selected in the military adviser group for the Iraqi Air Force, where he qualified as a test pilot for the MiG-21 and sat up the training school for the Iraqi IAF. He returned to Pakistan to participate in the third war with India and flew the Quick Reaction Close Support Missions especially in Shakargarh, where the battle with the Indian IAF was the most turbulent. After the war in 1971, Flt.Lt Alvi was sent to join the faculty at the Air Force Academy and served as a flight instructor on the flight manuals on the F-7P, a Chinese variant of MiG-21F.

Yom Kippur War
Pakistani prime minister Zulfikar Ali Bhutto sought to maintain close relationships with the Arab world. When the Yom Kippur war broke out, Alvi was one of the Pakistan Air Force fighter pilots who volunteered to go to the Middle East to support Egypt and Syria. By the time they arrived, however, Egypt and Israel had already concluded a ceasefire and only Syria remained in an active state of war against Israel. Alvi, who was serving as a Flight Lieutenant in 1973, joined the Syrian Air Force along with a Pakistani Squadron Leader Arif Manzoor. The Pakistani fighter pilots flew in a formation using the call-sign "Shahbaz" under the command of Squadron Leader Arif Manzoor.

Aerial fight over Golan
On 26 April 1974, PAF fighter pilot Flight Lieutenant Sattar Alvi on deputation to No. 67A Squadron, Syrian Air Force (SAF) was flying a SAF MiG-21F-13 (Serial No. 1863) out of Dumayr Air Base, Syria, in an eight-ship formation with a fellow PAF pilot and the flight leader, Squadron Leader Arif Manzoor.

Alvi came to worldwide international notice when he shot down an IAF Mirage IIICJ flown by Captain M. Lutz. On 26 April 1974, while on an aerial patrol, the PAF fighter pilot team, including Flight Lieutenant Captain Sattar Alvi, Squadron Leader Major Saleem Metla and the formation's leader Squadron Leader Major Arif Manzoor, had an encounter over the Golan Heights between a Mig-21 of the Syrian Air Force and two Israeli Mirages.

While leading a Mig-21 patrol along the border, Squadron Leader Arif Manzoor was apprised of the presence of two Israeli Phantom aircraft and was cautioned that these could be decoys while two other fast tracks approaching from the opposite direction might be the real threat. The latter turned out to be Mirages and a moment later Alvi, in Arif's formation saw the no. 2 Mirage breaking towards him. All this time, heavy radio jamming by Israeli ground stations was making things difficult, but the Pakistani pilots were used to such tactics. He managed to shoot down Captain Lutz, while the wingman quickly disengaged.

Honours
After the engagements, Flight Lieutenant Captain Sattar Alvi and Shahbaz formation leader Squadron Leader Major Arif Manzoor were awarded two of Syria's highest decorations for gallantry, the Wisaam Faris and Wisaam Shuja'at in 1973 by the President of Syria Hafez al-Assad in a public ceremony. The government of Pakistan also awarded each PAF pilot the Sitara-e-Jur'at. The prime minister Zulfikar Ali Bhutto personally met each of them and awarded the gallantry awards in public ceremonies.

Post war
After the war, Sattar Alvi was promoted to Wing Commander and went on to command PAF's elite Combat Commanders' School and the premier PAF Base Rafiqui. In 1994, he was promoted to Air Commodore and commanded the Pakistan Aeronautical Complex (PAC) until 1998. He retired as an Air Commodore in 1998 and received an honourable discharge from the air force.

Awards and decorations

Foreign Decorations

See also

 Group Captain Saiful Azam
 Sarfaraz Ahmed Rafiqui
 Mervyn Middlecoat
 Muhammad Mahmood Alam
 Marium Mukhtiar
 Ayesha Farooq
 8-Pass Charlie

References

External links
 Air Commodore Sattar Alvi 
 https://web.archive.org/web/20011217224910/http://www.scramble.nl/pk.htm
See April 1974
http://www.mabaig.co.uk/paf/PAINTINGS/mideast/MidEast.html
 Fl. Lt. Alvi
http://www.globalsecurity.org/military/world/pakistan/air-force-combat.htm

1944 births
People from Bannu District
Pashtun people
Government Emerson College alumni
Pakistani military personnel of the Indo-Pakistani War of 1971
Pakistani test pilots
Pakistan Air Force officers
Pakistani flying aces
Pilots of the Indo-Pakistani War of 1965
Pilots of the Indo-Pakistani War of 1971
Recipients of Sitara-e-Jurat
Living people
Pakistani expatriates in Syria
Yom Kippur War pilots
Hashemite people
Alids
Awan
Alvis